Lake Ouescapis is a freshwater body of the Broadback River watershed in the Municipality of Eeyou Istchee Baie-James (municipality), in the Administrative Region of Nord-du-Québec, in Quebec, in Canada.

Forestry is the main economic activity of the sector. Recreational tourism activities come second.

The hydrographic slope of Lake Ouescapis is accessible via the James Bay road (North-South direction) from Matagami, passing from the West of the lake.

The surface of lake Ouescapis is usually frozen from early November to mid-May, however, safe ice circulation is generally from mid-November to mid-April.

Geography

Toponymy
The toponym lake Ouescapis was formalized on December 5, 1968 at the Commission de toponymie du Québec, at the creation of this commission.

Notes and references

See also 

Eeyou Istchee James Bay
Broadback River drainage basin
Ouescapis
Jamésie